Yochelcionella is an extinct genus of basal molluscs which lived during the Tommotian epoch, the first epoch of the Cambrian period. This genus is often reconstructed to resemble snails.

Yochelcionella is the type genus of the family Yochelcionellidae.

Description 

This genus of molluscs possessed shells which were shaped like curved caps, with an exhaust pipe shaped "snorkel" emanating underneath where the apex (point of the shell) curves over.  It is believed that the "snorkel" was used in breathing, allowing waste water to flow away from the gills.

Taxonomy 
When they were first discovered, they were originally thought to be monoplacophorans.  Their snorkel may represent a move towards a tubular shell, such as is seen in the modern scaphopods.  It has also been interpreted as a precursor to the cephalopod funnel or siphuncle.

The taxonomy of the Gastropoda by Bouchet & Rocroi, 2005 categorizes Yochelcionella in the family Yochelcionellidae within the superfamilia Yochelcionelloidea within the Paleozoic molluscs of uncertain position within Mollusca (Gastropoda or Monoplacophora).

For an alternate 2007-2007 taxonomy by P. Yu. Parkhae see Helcionelloida.

Species
Species in the genus Yochelcionella include:
 Yochelcionella americana Runnegar & Pojeta, 1980
 Yochelcionella angustiplicata
 Yochelcionella chinensis Pei, 1985
 Yochelcionella crassa Zhegallo in Esakova et Zhegallo, 1996
 Yochelcionella cyrano  Runnegar and Pojeta 1974 type species.  Its type locality is ANU Collection 10352, 16 km northeast of Mootwingee Aboriginal Site, which is in a Solvan carbonate limestone in the Coonigan Formation of Australia..
 Yochelcionella daleki
 Yochelcionella erecta (Walcott, 1891)
 Yochelcionella gracilis Atkins & Peel, 2004
 Yochelcionella greenlandica Atkins & Peel, 2004
 Yochelcionella ostentata
 Yochelcionella saginata Vendrasco et al., 2010
 Yochelcionella snorkorum Vendrasco et al., 2010

References

External links
 Yochelcionellidae Palaeos
 Hellicionelloida Palaeos Cladogram

Yochelcionellidae
Cambrian molluscs
Cambrian animals of North America
Fossil taxa described in 1974
Paleozoic life of Newfoundland and Labrador
Paleozoic life of the Northwest Territories
Paleozoic life of Quebec
Cambrian genus extinctions